The Way Back is a 1958 Australian television play. It was the first professional live drama featuring professional actors filmed for Australian commercial television.

It was made for Easter Sunday.

Premise
The story of the rehabilitation of a derelict.

Cast
Margaret Christensen
Leonard Bullen
Frank Taylor
Ken Fraser

References

1950s Australian television plays